Andrew Smith (born 10 January 1985) is an Australian rugby union player, currently playing for Australian Super Rugby side the Brumbies. He plays as a centre.

Early life
Smith played junior club rugby for Lindfield Rugby Club and then St Ives Rugby Union Club, representing Gordon District in the annual State Championships.

Brumbies

Smith made his Brumbies debut during the 2010 Super 14 season against the Blues in Auckland. After a horror run of injuries, Smith returned during the 2013 Super Rugby season, setting up a crucial try against the British and Irish Lions during a tour game.

Munster
On 1 May 2014, it was announced that Smith would be joining Irish province Munster upon the conclusion of the 2014 Super Rugby season. Smith made his debut for Munster on 5 September 2014, starting in the sides 13-14 defeat in the opening Guinness Pro 12 game against Edinburgh. He scored his first try for Munster on 19 September 2014, against Zebre. He started in Munster's first European Rugby Champions Cup game against Sale Sharks on 18 October 2014. Smith scored a try in Munster's 42-20 win against Connacht on 28 March 2015. Smith played in the final of the Guinness Pro 12, against Glasgow, he scored Munster's only try, and they lost the game 31 to 13.

Montpellier
Smith joined Montpellier Hérault Rugby after leaving Munster. He signed a short-term deal running until 31 October 2015 to provide cover for the senior team during the 2015 Rugby World Cup.

Return to Brumbies
On 1 October 2015, it was announced that Smith will re-join the Brumbies for the 2016 and 2017 Super Rugby seasons, having signed a two-year contract.

Super Rugby statistics

References

External links
Brumbies Profile
Munster Profile

1985 births
Living people
Australian rugby union players
Rugby union centres
ACT Brumbies players
Munster Rugby players
Montpellier Hérault Rugby players
Rugby union players from Sydney